There are a number of elementary schools named Linda Vista Elementary School:

 Linda Vista Elementary School (Orange, California)
 Linda Vista Elementary School (Mission Viejo, California)